Dischistodus perspicillatus, commonly known as the white damsel, is a species of fish native to the Andaman Sea and eastern Indian Ocean.

References

External links
 

Fish of Thailand
Fish described in 1830
Taxa named by Georges Cuvier
Fish of the Indian Ocean
perspicillatus